Zeynabad-e Sangi (also Romanized as Zeynābād-e Sangī; also known as Zeynābād and Zin Abad) is a village in Qaryah ol Kheyr Rural District, in the Central District of Darab County, Fars Province, Iran. At the 2006 census, its population was 794, in 169 families.

References 

Populated places in Darab County